On 12 July 1969, a Douglas DC-3 operated by Royal Nepal Airlines crashed in Nepal en route from Tribhuvan International Airport to Simara Airport on a domestic scheduled passenger flight. The wreckage of the aircraft, registration 9N-AAP, was found in Hetauda, Makwanpur District. All 31 passengers and four crew aboard were killed in the crash. An investigation into the crash was launched by Nepalese authorities after the accident site was located.

Aircraft 
The aircraft involved in the crash was a Douglas DC-3 operated by Royal Nepal Airlines. Its maiden flight was in 1946 with Aer Lingus and was sold to Royal Nepal Airlines in 1964.

Crew and passengers 
All occupants on board died in the crash; they included the four crew members and 31 passengers.

Incident 
The flight was a scheduled domestic flight from Kathmandu to Simara in the Terrai region of Nepal. In the clouds above Hetauda, the aircraft hit a tree on a mountain, which the crew did not see due to bad visibility. The aircraft crashed and caught fire. All occupants were killed in the crash.

At the time, it was the worst aviation accident in Nepali history. It was the third accident of this aircraft operated by Royal Nepal Airlines, who were the sole airline operator in Nepal at that time.

See also
 List of airplane accidents in Nepal

References 

Aviation accidents and incidents in 1969
Aviation accidents and incidents in Nepal
1969 in Nepal
Accidents and incidents involving the Douglas DC-3
1969 disasters in Nepal
Nepal Airlines accidents and incidents